Lorenzo Bucchi (born 21 November 1983, in Rome) is an Italian retired football goalkeeper. He is currently working as a goalkeeper coach at FC Luzern.

References

External links

Profile at football.ch

1983 births
Living people
Italian footballers
Ternana Calcio players
S.S. Fidelis Andria 1928 players
AC Bellinzona players
Grasshopper Club Zürich players
FC Luzern players
Swiss Super League players
Association football goalkeepers
Footballers from Rome
Italian expatriate footballers
Expatriate footballers in Switzerland
Italian expatriate sportspeople in Switzerland
FC Fribourg players